Classic Hits of Harry Chapin is a posthumously produced compilation album by American singer-songwriter Harry Chapin. It was released in 2003 by the Warner Music Group and contains a collection of Chapin's hit singles.

Track listing

Personnel
Howard Albert – Producer
Ron Albert – Producer
Ron Bacchiocchi – Synthesizer
Ed Bednarski – Clarinet
Buzz Brauner – Musician
Yvonne Cable – Cello
Harry Chapin – Guitar, Guitar (Acoustic), Primary Artist, Vocals
Jim Chapin – Drums
Stephen Chapin – Arranger, Brass Arrangement, Keyboards, producer, Vocals (Background)
Tom Chapin – Guitar (Acoustic), Vocals (Background)
Rita Coolidge – Vocals (Background)
Carolyn Dennis – Vocals (Background)
Ron Evanuik – Cello
Donna Fein – Vocals (Background)
Howie Fields – Drums
Steve Gadd – Drums
Don Grolnick – Keyboards
Jeff Gross – Musician
Bobbye Hall – Percussion
Muffy Hendrix – Vocals (Background)
Jac Holzman – Producer
Irving Spice Strings – Musician
Fred Kewley – Producer
David Kondziela – Vocals, Vocals (Background)
Kris Kristofferson – Vocals (Background)
Russ Kunkel – Drums, Percussion
Paul Leka – Arranger, producer
Mike Lewis – Arranger
Michael Masters – Cello
Ron Palmer – Guitar, Guitar (Electric)
Don Payne – Guitar (Bass)
Frank Porto – Accordion
Zizi Roberts – Vocals (Background)
Kim Scholes – Cello
Allan Schwartzberg – Drums
Tim Scott – Cello
Frank Simms – Vocals (Background)
George Simms – Vocals (Background)
Ken Smith – Mandolin
Mike Solomon – Musician
Bob Springer – Musician
Billy Swan – Vocals (Background)
John Tropea – Guitar
Doug Walker – Guitar, Mandolin, Vocals (Background)
John Wallace – Guitar (Bass), Vocals (Background)
Rob White – Musician

References

External links 
 

2003 compilation albums
Harry Chapin albums
Compilation albums published posthumously